Beyond Belief: Science, Religion, Reason and Survival was the first gathering of The Science Network's annual Beyond Belief symposia, held from November 5–7, 2006, at the Salk Institute for Biological Studies in La Jolla, California. 

It was described by The New York Times, as "a free-for-all on science and religion", which seemed at times like "the founding convention for a political party built on a single plank: in a world dangerously charged with ideology, science needs to take on an evangelical role, vying with religion as teller of the greatest story ever told."<ref name = "nyt">[https://www.nytimes.com/2006/11/21/science/21belief.html?n=Top/Reference/Times%20Topics/People/T/Tyson,%20Neil%20DeGrasse&_r=2&pagewanted=all A Free-for-All on Science and Religion," George Johnson, The New York Times, Section F, Page 1, November 21, 2006]</ref>

Conference goals and topics

The event was conceived to challenge the efforts of the Templeton Foundation to reconcile science with religion, according to its underwriter Robert Zeps, who told an interviewer:I am not anti-Templeton in the sense of funding scientists to say mean things about religion. I simply believe that all study should be free of any particular agenda besides learning... Most take the position that the religious right are just nuts who are loud but frankly undeserving of a response... I believe that Bill Gates and Steve Jobs and pretty much all of the tech age wealth is firmly on the side of science and they need to step up and say so in a way that is heard by the anti-science lobby.Many conference participants leveled strong criticism at the activities of the Templeton Foundation, charging that it attempted to blur the line between science and religion, and that it funded "garbage research" aimed at showing a healing effect of prayer. The Templeton Foundation has funded numerous conferences intended to "smooth over the differences between science and religion" and portray them as metaphysically equivalent.New Scientist'' summed up the topics to be discussed as a list of three questions:

 Can science help us create a new rational narrative as poetic and powerful as those that have traditionally sustained societies?
 Can we treat religion as a natural phenomenon?
 Can we be good without God? And if not God, then what?

The conference devoted its final session to "the negative effects of introducing religion into medicine".

Speakers

 Steven Weinberg
 Lawrence Krauss
 Carolyn Porco
 Richard Dawkins
 Peter Atkins
 Sam Harris
 Michael Shermer
 Peter Turchin
 Neil deGrasse Tyson
 Terrence Sejnowski
 Joan Roughgarden
 Sean M. Carroll
 David Sloan Wilson
 John Allen Paulos
 David Brin
 David Albert
 Leon Lederman
 Roger Bingham
 Francisco Ayala
 Stuart Hameroff
 Vilayanur S. Ramachandran
 Paul Davies
 Jonathan Haidt
 Steven Nadler
 Patricia Churchland
 Susan Neiman
 George Koob
 Daniel Dennett
 Stuart Kauffman
 Loyal Rue
 Elizabeth Loftus
 Mahzarin Banaji
 Scott Atran
 Harold Kroto
 Charles L. Harper Jr., John Templeton Foundation
 Ann Druyan
 James Woodward, University of Pittsburgh
 Melvin Konner
 Philip Zimbardo
 Paul Churchland
 Richard P. Sloan, Columbia University Medical Center
 Tony Haymet

Perspectives from participants

Most participants were critical of religion and its effects upon public opinion, scientific inquiry, and policy. Steven Weinberg said, "the world needs to wake up from its long nightmare of religious belief." Sam Harris stated that science was about "intellectual honesty". Richard Dawkins expressed more forceful views, calling religion "brainwashing" and "child abuse".

Lawrence Krauss argued that science could not necessarily disprove the existence of god; Francisco Ayala argued that people need "meaning and purpose and life".

Emory anthropologist Melvin Konner condemned what he saw as overly simplistic representations of religion by Dawkins and others present. He said that the event came to resemble a "den of vipers" debating "[whether to] bash religion with a crowbar or only with a baseball bat?"

Perspective from the Templeton Foundation

A Templeton spokesperson responded by warning against "commercialized ideological scientism", the effort to profit from promoting science as the only guide to truth.

References

External links
Official website
"God, Science, and an Unbeliever's Utopia: Stellar Group of Scientists Gathers to Mull Religion, Atheism, and Much Else" by John Allen Paulos, ABC News commentary 2007
Beyond Belief: Science, Religion, Reason and Survival DVD Release on Internet Archive

Religion and science
Criticism of religion
2006 conferences
2006 in California
2006 in religion
2006 in science